José Marcos Aguilar Moreno (born 19 March 1934) is a Mexican politician from the National Action Party. From 2000 to 2003 he served as Deputy of the LVIII Legislature of the Mexican Congress representing the Federal District.

References

1934 births
Living people
Politicians from Mexico City
National Action Party (Mexico) politicians
21st-century Mexican politicians
20th-century Mexican politicians
National Autonomous University of Mexico alumni
Members of the Congress of the State of Mexico
Deputies of the LVIII Legislature of Mexico
Members of the Chamber of Deputies (Mexico) for Mexico City